Rasmus Nielsen (born January 27, 1970) is a Danish biologist and professor in the Department of Integrative Biology at the University of California, Berkeley. His research focuses on statistical genetics and computational genomics as they relate to evolutionary biology. Much of his research has focused on the molecular mechanisms of evolutionary adaptations. For example, in 2010, his research group discovered the variant in the EPAS1 gene that allows Tibetans to live at high altitudes. His research has also identified an evolved genetic adaptation among the Inuit that allows them to metabolize fatty acids.

References

External links
Faculty page

1970 births
Living people
Danish geneticists
Danish biologists
Evolutionary biologists
Statistical geneticists
Danish emigrants to the United States
UC Berkeley College of Engineering alumni
University of California, Berkeley College of Letters and Science faculty
Population geneticists
Cornell University faculty
University of Copenhagen alumni
Sloan Research Fellows